Anton "Toni" Unseld (4 July 1894 – 6 December 1932) was a German footballer and later manager. He played primarily as a defender.

References

1894 births
1932 deaths
Association football defenders
German footballers
German football managers
Stuttgarter Kickers players
Stuttgarter Kickers managers
SSV Ulm 1846 players
1. FC Saarbrücken managers
Sportspeople from Ulm
Footballers from Baden-Württemberg